Moshoeshoe Chabeli (died October 30, 2013) was a South African actor.

He portrayed Harold in the 2003 film, Stander with Thomas Jane.  He also portrayed the Priest in the 2013 film, The Forgotten Kingdom.  On television he appeared in the sitcom, Mponeng, which is a South African adaptation of the British sitcom, Keeping Up Appearances.

He was a royal descent of Moshoeshoe I.  He died on October 30, 2013 following a battle of cancer.

Select filmography
Stander (2003)
Beat the Drum (2003)
Critical Assignment (2004)
The Forgotten Kingdom (2013)

References

External links
 

21st-century South African male actors
South African male film actors
South African male television actors
2013 deaths
Deaths from cancer in South Africa